M-146 was a state trunkline highway in the US state of Michigan that initially served as a bypass for traffic going around Port Huron and as a short cut for traffic between U.S. Highway 25 (US 25) and M-21. Later it connected to the Blue Water Bridge before it was truncated to its final form. Segments of M-146 still exist today as state highways as part of Interstate 94 (I-94) and I-69 and the Lapeer Connector.

Route description
As the highway last existed, its southern end was at an intersection with M-21 (Lapeer Road) in a residential area of Port Huron west of the Black River.

History
When the route debuted in 1933 it served as a connector between US 25 in southwest Port Huron and M-21 along the west side of town. In 1954 a new approach was built from M-21 to the foot of the Blue Water Bridge, and M-146 was extended northward and easterly, designated along this new route. By 1958, this newer segment was converted to freeway specifications, and in 1964, with the completion of the I-94/US 25 freeway, M-146 was removed from that portion of the route. By the next year, the M-146 designation only remained along the stretch of freeway which now serves as the exit 274 interchange on I-94, and was removed from 24th Street through town. The alignment of the freeway stretch of M-146 was shifted slightly as well, allowing for a smoother transition between it and westbound I-94. In addition, the diamond interchange with Water Street along the Blue Water Bridge approach was reconstructed and appropriated into the alignment of I-94. In 1966, with the completion of a new freeway alignment for M-21 between Wadhams and downtown Port Huron, the M-146 designation was removed from the state trunkline system, and has not been used since. The connector between Lapeer Street and present-day I-94 is now known as the Lapeer Connector and Connector 69.

Major intersections

See also

References

External links

M-146 at Michigan Highways

146
Transportation in St. Clair County, Michigan